Clymers is an unincorporated community in Clinton Township, Cass County, Indiana.

History
Clymers was laid out in 1869. It was named for its founder, George Clymer. A post office was established at Clymers in 1890, and remained in operation until it was discontinued in 1919.

Geography
Indiana State Road 25 and the Norfolk Southern Railway both pass northeast through town.

References

Unincorporated communities in Cass County, Indiana
Unincorporated communities in Indiana